The Skaraborg Regiment, designation P 4, is a Swedish Army armoured regiment that traces its origins back to the 16th century. It was converted from an infantry regiment in 1942. The regiment's soldiers were originally recruited from Skaraborg County, and it is currently garrisoned in Skövde, in the former Skaraborg County.

History
The regiment was converted from an infantry regiment to an armored regiment in 1942 and was given the name Skaraborg Armoured Regiment. The regiment was given the designation P 4 (4th Armoured Regiment) and was garrisoned in Skövde. On 1 April 1963, it regained its old name of the Royal Skaraborg Regiment. In 1974, the regiment gained the new designation P 4/Fo 35 as a consequence of a merge with the local defence district Fo 35.

For a short time in the 1990s, the unit was then merged with the wartime organised Skaraborg Brigade (MekB 9). In accordance with that year's Defence Act, the unit was reorganised once again in 2000, and was designated P 4 once again. Its name was also changed back to Skaraborg Regiment.

Campaigns 

None

Organisation 

 
In peacetime Skaraborg Regiment trains conscripts for the Swedish wartime organisation. Skaraborg Regiment trains armoured troops and use the Swedish modified Leopard 2A5 IS, Strv 122, and vehicles from the CV90 family. The peacetime organisation trains one battalion per year with around 600 troops. The main garrison is situated in Skövde in Västergötland and most of the training grounds can be found around Skövde, the regiment also has a smaller detachment in Kvarn in Östergötland where its Grenadier Company is trained.

 Skaraborg Regiment
 2nd Brigade Staff
 41st Mechanized Battalion
 Staff and Support Company, 2x Tank Companies Strv 122, 2x Mechanized Companies CV90, Logistic Company
 42nd Mechanized Battalion
 Staff and Support Company, 2x Tank Companies Strv 122, 2x Mechanized Companies CV90, Logistic Company
 Gotland Battle Group
 Staff and Support Company, Tank Company Strv 122, Mechanized Company CV90, Logistic Company
 1st Heavy Transport Company
 2nd Brigade Reconnaissance Company
 Bohusdal Group, which trains the 40th Home Guard Battalion (Light infantry)
 Skaraborg Group, which trains the 38th, and 39th Home Guard battalions (Light infantry)

Training Companies in peacetime:

 Skaraborg Regiment
 Life Company: training staff and support companies, and engineer platoons of the 41st and 42nd mechanized battalions
 Skånings Company: training mechanized infantry companies of the 41st and 42nd mechanized battalions
 Wilska Company: training mechanized infantry companies of the 41st and 42nd mechanized battalions
 Wartofta Company: training tank companies of the 41st and 42nd mechanized battalions, and Gotland Battle Group
 Grenadier Company: training brigade reconnaissance company
 Kåkind Company: basic training 
 Wadsbo Company: training logistics companies of the 41st and 42nd mechanized battalions, and the 1st Heavy Transport Company

Other vehicles used by the regiment: TGB 11, 13 & 20, Bv 206.

Heraldry and traditions

Colours, standards and guidons
When the regiment was reorganized into an armoured unit, the colour from the time as an infantry unit was kept. The colour was of the 1844 model, and had been presented on 24 June 1858 by Crown Prince Carl Ludvig Eugen (later Charles XV), then in the form of two battalion colours. The colour originally had only two battle honours, Lützen (1632) and Malatitze (1708). After further investigations, the regiment was admitted in 1929 on the colour of the 2nd Battalion, to add six battle honours; Varberg (1565), Narva (1581), Leipzig (1642), Warsaw (1656), Lund (1676) and Landskrona (1677). Until 1994, the regimental colour was the oldest in use when it was replaced by a new colour. The new colour was presented to the regiment at the regimental barracks in Skövde by His Majesty the King Carl XVI Gustaf on 22 September 1995. The colour is drawn by Ingrid Lamby and embroidered by machine in insertion technique by Maj-Britt Salander/company Blå Kusten. Blazon: "On a cloth bended sinister in black and yellow the provincial badge of Västergötland; a double-tailed rampant lion counterchanged, armed red, between two white estoiles in the black field. On a yellow border at the upper side of the colour, battle honours in black."

Coat of arms
The coat of the arms of the Skaraborg Regiment (P 4/Fo 35) 1977–1994, the Skaraborg Brigade (PB 9/MekB 9) 1994–2000 and Skaraborg Regiment (P 4) since 2000. Blazon: "The provincial badge of Västergötland, per bend sinister sable and or charged with a double-tailed lion rampant counterchanged, armed and langued gules between two estoiles argent in the first field. The shield surmounted two arms in fess, embowed and vambraced, the hands holding swords in saltire, or". The coat of arms of the Skaraborg Regiment (P 4/Fo 35) 1994–2000 and the Skaraborg Group since 2000. Blazon: "The provincial badge of Västergötland, per bend sinister sable and or charged with a double-tailed lion rampant counter-changed, armed and langued gules between two estoiles argent in the first field. The shield surmounted two swords in saltire, or".

Medals
The medal ribbon is divided in black and yellow moiré with a white stripe on the middle followed on both sides by a red stripe.

Other
The regimental march is "Geschwindmarsch" by C A Herrmann and it was adopted in the 19th century. It was first played during Gustav IV Adolf's reign. The oldest preserved score is from 1833. It was established as regimental march in 1953 by Army Order 33/1953. The march was used by the Skaraborg Brigade the years 1994–2000, and since 2000 by Skaraborg Group.

The regimental motto,  ("The heritage obligates"), originates from Västgöta Regiment (I 6) and was adopted in 1981 by the then regimental commander colonel Norderup in connection with the 350-year anniversary of the Skaraborg Regiment.

Since 1 January 1928, the regiment are continuing the traditions of Västgöta Regiment (I 6). The traditions of Bohuslän Regiment (I 17) is continued by the Bohus Battalion (40th Home Guard Battalion) in the Bohusdal Group.

Commanding officers
Regimental commanders active from when the regiment was organized as an armored unit. For regimental commanders before 1942, see Skaraborg Regiment (infantry). For the years 1998–2000, see Skaraborg Regiment and Skaraborg Brigade.

Commanders

1942–1946: Birger Pontén
1946–1948: Nils Björk
1949–1954: Per Arvid Christian Ahlgren
1954–1966: Hans Waldemar Malmgren
1966–1967: Hugo Cederschiöld
1967–1968: Gustaf Peyron
1968–1976: Per Anton Björkman
1976–1980: Per-Gunnar Brissman
1980–1984: Carl-Gösta Norderup
1984–1987: Bror Gustaf Arne Lindblom
1987–1992: Lars Jerker Löfberg
1992–1993: Alf Sandqvist
1993–1995: Björn Anderson
1995–1997: Arne Hedman
1998–2000: See Skaraborg Regiment and Skaraborg Brigade
2000–2004: Anders Lindberg
2004–2007: Håkan Swedin
2007–2012: Ronald Månsson
2012–2017: Fredrik Ståhlberg
2017–2021: Bengt Alexandersson
2021–20xx: Stefan Pettersson

Deputy commanders
2015–2018: Colonel Stefan Sandborg
2018–2019: Colonel Lennart Widerström

Names, designations and locations

See also
List of Swedish armoured regiments

Footnotes

References

Notes

Print

Web

Further reading

External links

 

Armored regiments of the Swedish Army
Military units and formations established in 1942
Military units and formations disestablished in 1997
Military units and formations established in 2000
1942 establishments in Sweden
1997 disestablishments in Sweden
2000 establishments in Sweden
Skövde Garrison